The dollar (sign: $; code: BSD) has been the currency of The Bahamas since 1966. It is normally abbreviated with the dollar sign $, or alternatively B$ to distinguish it from other dollar-denominated currencies. It is divided into 100 cents.

On 20 October 2020, the Bahamas became the first country to have a legal digital currency, introducing the Sand Dollar as an alternative to the traditional Bahamian dollar.

Relationship with the US dollar

The Bahamian dollar is pegged to the US dollar on a one-to-one basis. The Central Bank of The Bahamas states that it uses reserve requirements, changes in the Bank discount rate and selective credit controls, supplemented by moral suasion, as main instruments of monetary policy. The Central Bank's objective is to keep stable conditions, including credit, in order to maintain the parity between the US dollar and the Bahamian dollar while allowing economic development to proceed.

Although the US dollar (as any other foreign currency) is subject to exchange control laws in The Bahamas, the parity between Bahamian dollars and US dollars means that any business will accept either US or Bahamian currency and many of the businesses that serve tourists have extra US dollars on hand for the convenience of American tourists.

History

The dollar replaced the pound at a rate of 1 dollar = 7 shillings (US$0.98) in 1966, 7 years before independence. This rate allowed the establishment of parity with the US dollar, due to the sterling/dollar rate then being fixed at £1 = $2.80, after a slight revaluation of 2%. To aid in decimalisation, three-dollar bills and fifteen-cent coins were created, as three dollars was roughly equivalent to one pound, and fifteen cents to a shilling, at the time of transition.

On 20 October 2020, the Bahamas became the first country to have a legal digital currency, introducing the Sand Dollar as an alternative to the traditional Bahamian dollar.

Coins

In 1966, coins were introduced in denominations of 1, 5, 10, 15, 25, 50 cents, 1 and 2 dollars. The 1 cent was struck in nickel-brass, the 5, 10, and 15 cent in cupronickel, the 25 cent in nickel, and the 50 cent and 1 dollar in silver. The 10 cent was scallop shaped, whilst the 15 cent was square. Silver coins were not issued for circulation after 1966. Bronze replaced nickel-brass in the 1 cent in 1970, followed by brass in 1974 and copper-plated zinc in 1985. In 1989, cupro-nickel 50 cent and 1 dollar coins were issued for circulation, although they did not replace the corresponding banknotes.

The now-obsolete 1 cent coin is about the size of a US dime, and the 5 and 25 cent coins are about the same size as their US counterparts but with different metal compositions. The 15 cent coins are still produced by the Central Bank. All coins now bear the Bahamian Coat of Arms on one side with the words "Commonwealth of The Bahamas" and the date. The reverses of the coins show objects from Bahamian culture with the value of the coins in words. The 1 cent has three starfish, the 5 cent a pineapple, the 10 cent two bonefish, the 15 cent a hibiscus, and the 25 cent a native sloop.

The 1 cent was demonetised at the end of 2020. All cash transactions in the Bahamas are now rounded to the nearest five cents.

Banknotes
The Bahamas Monetary Authority took over the issuance of paper money in 1968, issuing the same denominations. The Central Bank of the Bahamas was established on 1 June 1974 and took over note issuance from that point forward.

The dollar has undergone several revisions in the last twenty years, one of the more notable being an extremely colourful redesign in celebration of the quincentennial of the landing of Christopher Columbus on a Bahamian island he named San Salvador.

All banknotes other than the fifty cent note have been undergoing design changes to foil forgery in recent years, although the notes implemented more stringent security long before the US's recent redesign of their notes. All banknotes are the same physical size, like the US dollar but unlike the euro. The latest counterfeit-proof formula is the "Counterfeit Resistant Integrated Security Product", or CRISP. The new  banknote was released on 5 August 2005, while the  banknote was released on 6 September 2006. In October 2005, someone counterfeited one of the new CRISP  bills, serial number A161315. Bahamian authorities warned merchants to look for banknotes that lacked the distinctive watermark.

Until 1992, all notes displayed a portrait of Queen Elizabeth II (Head of State) but notes began to display portraits of prominent deceased Bahamian politicians. This policy is now being reversed, with the return of the Queen's portrait to the  note. The $ shows an older Queen Elizabeth II and the back shows a picture of Sister Sarah in the Nassau Straw Market; the  shows Sir Lynden Pindling and on the back the Royal Bahamas Police Force Band; the  has a young Queen Elizabeth II and on the back shows a Family Island Regatta with native sloops; the  – Sir Cecil Wallace-Whitfield and the back shows a Junkanoo group 'rushing' in the Junkanoo parade; the  – an older Queen Elizabeth II (replacing Sir Stafford Sands) and the back shows the Hope Town Lighthouse and settlement in Abaco, the  – Sir Milo Butler; the  – Sir Roland Symonette; the  – an older Queen Elizabeth II and the back shows a jumping blue marlin, the national fish of The Bahamas. For this reason, the Bahamian  bill is often referred to by locals as "a blue marlin".

Since 2016, a new series called CRISP Evolution has been progressively introduced, maintaining the subjects and motifs of the previous banknotes while updating the security features and color schemes.

See also
 Central banks and currencies of the Caribbean
 Economy of the Bahamas

References

Sources

External links
 The Central Bank of The Bahamas
 Historical exchange rates of AUD/BSD (from the year 1800 to present time).
 Historical chart of AUD/BSD (from the year 1800 to present time).
 Historical exchange rates of CAD/BSD (from the year 1800 to present time).  
 Historical chart of CAD/BSD (from the year 1800 to present time).  
 Historical exchange rates of CHF/BSD (from the year 1800 to present time). 
 Historical chart of CHF/BSD (from the year 1800 to present time). 
 Historical exchange rates of EUR/BSD (from the year 1800 to present time).
 Historical chart of EUR/BSD (from the year 1800 to present time).
 Historical exchange rates of GBP/BSD (from the year 1800 to present time).
 Historical chart of GBP/BSD (from the year 1800 to present time).
 Historical exchange rates of JPY/BSD (from the year 1800 to present time).
 Historical chart of JPY/BSD (from the year 1800 to present time).
 Historical exchange rates of NZD/BSD (from the year 1800 to present time).
 Historical chart of NZD/BSD (from the year 1800 to present time).
 Historical exchange rates of USD/BSD (from the year 1800 to present time).
 Historical chart of USD/BSD (from the year 1800 to present time).

Currencies introduced in 1966
Circulating currencies
Currencies of the Caribbean
Currencies of the Commonwealth of Nations
Economy of the Bahamas
Fixed exchange rate